Project Plowshare was the overall United States program for the development of techniques to use nuclear explosives for peaceful construction purposes. The program was organized in June 1957 as part of the worldwide Atoms for Peace efforts. As part of the program, 31 nuclear warheads were detonated in 27 separate tests. A similar program was carried out in the Soviet Union under the name Nuclear Explosions for the National Economy.

Successful demonstrations of non-combat uses for nuclear explosives include rock blasting, stimulation of tight gas, chemical element manufacture, unlocking some of the mysteries of the R-process of stellar nucleosynthesis and probing the composition of the Earth's deep crust, creating reflection seismology vibroseis data which has helped geologists and follow-on mining company prospecting.

The project's uncharacteristically large and atmospherically vented Sedan nuclear test also led geologists to determine that Barringer crater was formed as a result of a meteor impact and not from a volcanic eruption, as had earlier been assumed. This became the first crater on Earth definitely proven to be from an impact event.

Negative impacts from Project Plowshare's tests generated significant public opposition, which eventually led to the program's termination in 1977. These consequences included tritiated water (projected to increase by CER Geonuclear Corporation to a level of 2% of the then-maximum level for drinking water) and the deposition of fallout from radioactive material being injected into the atmosphere before underground testing was mandated by treaty.

Rationale
By exploiting the peaceful uses of the "friendly atom" in medical applications, earth removal, and later in nuclear power plants, the nuclear industry and government sought to allay public fears about nuclear technology and promote the acceptance of nuclear weapons. At the peak of the Atomic Age, the United States Federal government initiated Project Plowshare, involving "peaceful nuclear explosions". The United States Atomic Energy Commission chairman at the time, Lewis Strauss, announced that the Plowshares project was intended to "highlight the peaceful applications of nuclear explosive devices and thereby create a climate of world opinion that is more favorable to weapons development and tests".

Proposals 

Proposed uses for nuclear explosives under Project Plowshare included widening the Panama Canal, constructing a new sea-level waterway through Nicaragua nicknamed the Pan-Atomic Canal, cutting paths through mountainous areas for highways, and connecting inland river systems.  Other proposals involved blasting caverns for water, natural gas, and petroleum storage.  Serious consideration was also given to using these explosives for various mining operations.  One proposal suggested using nuclear blasts to connect underground aquifers in Arizona.  Another plan involved surface blasting on the western slope of California's Sacramento Valley for a water transport project.

One of the first serious cratering proposals that came close to being carried out was Project Chariot, which would have used several hydrogen bombs to create an artificial harbor at Cape Thompson, Alaska. It was never carried out due to concerns for the native populations and the fact that there was little potential use for the harbor to justify its risk and expense.

Project Carryall, proposed in 1963 by the Atomic Energy Commission, the California Division of Highways (now Caltrans), and the Santa Fe Railway, would have used 22 nuclear explosions to excavate a massive roadcut through the Bristol Mountains in the Mojave Desert, to accommodate construction of Interstate 40 and a new rail line.

A project proposed in a 1963 memorandum by Lawrence Livermore National Laboratory would have used 520 2-megaton nuclear explosions to excavate a canal through the Negev Desert in Israel at an estimated cost of $575 million ($5 billion in 2021), to serve as an alternative route to the Suez Canal.

At the end of the program, a major objective was to develop nuclear explosives, and blast techniques, for stimulating the flow of natural gas in "tight" underground reservoir formations. In the 1960s, a proposal was suggested for a modified in situ shale oil extraction process which involved creation of a rubble chimney (a zone in the oil shale formation created by breaking the rock into fragments) using a nuclear explosive.  However, this approach was abandoned for a number of technical reasons.

Plowshare testing 
The test had many objectives. The most public of these involved the generation of steam which could then be used to generate electricity. Another objective was the production of useful radioisotopes and their recovery. Another experiment involved neutron time-of-flight physics. A fourth experiment involved geophysical studies based upon the timed seismic source. Only the last objective was considered a complete success. The blast unintentionally vented radioactive steam while the press watched. The partly developed Project Coach detonation experiment that was to follow adjacent to the Gnome test was then canceled.

A number of proof-of-concept cratering blasts were conducted; including the Buggy shot of five 1-kiloton devices for a channel/trench in Area 30 and the largest being 104 kiloton (435 terajoule) on July 6, 1962, at the north end of Yucca Flats, within the Atomic Energy Commission's Nevada Test Site (NTS) in southern Nevada. The radioactive dust plume headed northeast and then east towards the Mississippi River.

Over the next 11 years 26 more nuclear explosion tests were conducted under the U.S. PNE program. The radioactive blast debris from 839 U.S. underground nuclear test explosions remains buried in-place and has been judged impractical to remove by the DOE's Nevada Site Office. Funding quietly ended in 1977.  Costs for the program have been estimated at more than (US) $770 million.

Natural gas stimulation experiment
Three nuclear explosion experiments were intended to stimulate the flow of natural gas from "tight" formation gas fields. Industrial participants included El Paso Natural Gas Company for the Gasbuggy test; CER Geonuclear Corporation and Austral Oil Company for the Rulison test; and CER Geonuclear Corporation for the Rio Blanco test.

If it had been successful, plans called for the use of hundreds of specialized nuclear explosives in the western Rockies gas fields. The previous two tests had indicated that the produced natural gas would be too radioactive for safe use; the Rio Blanco test found that the three blast cavities had not connected as hoped, and the resulting gas still contained unacceptable levels of radionuclides.

By 1974, approximately $82 million had been invested in the nuclear gas stimulation technology program. It was estimated that even after 25 years of production of all the natural gas deemed recoverable, only 15 to 40% of the investment would be recouped.  Also, the concept that stove burners in California might soon emit trace amounts of blast radionuclides into family homes did not sit well with the general public.  The contaminated gas was never channeled into commercial supply lines.

The situation remained so for the next three decades, but a resurgence in Colorado Western slope natural gas drilling has brought resource development closer and closer to the original underground detonations. By mid-2009, 84 drilling permits had been issued within a  radius, with 11 permits within  mile of the site.

Impacts, opposition and economics
Operation Plowshare "started with great expectations and high hopes". Planners believed that the projects could be completed safely, but there was less confidence that they could be completed more economically than conventional methods. Moreover, there was insufficient public and Congressional support for the projects. Projects Chariot and Coach were two examples where technical problems and environmental concerns prompted further feasibility studies which took several years, and each project was eventually canceled.

Citizen groups voiced concerns and opposition to some of the Plowshare tests.  There were concerns that the blast effects from the Schooner explosion could dry up active wells or trigger an earthquake. There was opposition to both Rulison and Rio Blanco tests because of possible radioactive gas flaring operations and other environmental hazards. In a 1973 article, Time used the term "Project Dubious" to describe Operation Plowshare.

There were negative impacts from a select few of Project Plowshare’s 27 nuclear explosions, primarily those conducted in the project's infancy and those that were very high in explosive yield.

On Project Gnome and the Sedan test:

Project Plowshare shows how something intended to improve national security can unwittingly do the opposite if it fails to fully consider the social, political, and environmental consequences. It also “underscores that public resentment and opposition can stop projects in their tracks”.

The social scientist Benjamin Sovacool contends that the main problem with oil and gas stimulation, which many considered the most promising economic use of nuclear detonations, was that the produced oil and gas was radioactive, which caused consumers to reject it and this was ultimately the program's downfall. Oil and gas are sometimes naturally radioactive to begin with, however, and the industry is set up to deal with oil and gas that contain radioactive contaminants. Historian Dr. Michael Payne notes that it was primarily changing public opinion, in response to events such as the Cuban Missile Crisis, that drove the protests, court cases and general hostility that ended the oil and gas stimulation efforts. Furthermore, as the years went by without further development and production of nuclear weapons slowed, interest in peaceful applications waned in the 1950s–60s. Cheaper, non-nuclear stimulation techniques suitable for most US gas fields were developed in the following years.

As a point of comparison, the most successful and profitable nuclear stimulation effort that did not result in customer product contamination issues was the 1976 Project Neva on the Sredne-Botuobinsk gas field in the Soviet Union, made possible by multiple cleaner stimulation explosives, favorable rock strata and the possible creation of an underground contaminant storage cavity. The Soviet Union retains the record for the cleanest/lowest fission-fraction nuclear devices so far demonstrated.

The public records for devices that produced the highest proportion of their yield via fusion-only reactions, and therefore created orders of magnitude smaller amounts of long-lived fission products as a result, are the USSR's Peaceful nuclear explosions of the 1970s, with the three detonations that excavated part of Pechora–Kama Canal, being cited as 98% fusion each in the Taiga test's three 15-kiloton explosive yield devices, that is, a total fission fraction of 0.3 kilotons in a 15 kt device. In comparison, the next three high fusion-yielding devices were all much too high in total explosive yield for oil and gas stimulation: the 50-megaton Tsar Bomba achieved a yield 97% derived from fusion, while in the US, the 9.3-megaton Hardtack Poplar test is reported as 95.2%, and the 4.5-megaton Redwing Navajo test as 95% derived from fusion.

Nuclear tests 
The U.S. conducted 27 PNE shots in conjunction with other, weapons-related, test series. A report by the Federation of American Scientists includes yields slightly different from those presented below.

Non-nuclear tests 
In addition to the nuclear tests, Plowshare executed a number of non-nuclear test projects in an attempt to learn more about how the nuclear explosives could best be used.  Several of these projects led to practical utility as well as to furthering knowledge about large explosives. These projects included:

Proposed nuclear projects

A number of projects were proposed and some planning accomplished, but were not followed through on.  A list of these is given here:

See also
 Plowshares movement
 Atoms for Peace
 Nuclear Explosions for the National Economy – the equivalent Soviet program(s) that achieved "practical application" status.
 Atomic age
 Project Oilsand, a 1958 proposal to exploit the Athabasca oil sands in Canada via the underground detonation of nuclear bombs.
 Project Orion, a study conducted from the 1950's to the 1960's into propelling spacecraft by detonating nuclear bombs behind them.

Notes

References

Further reading
 IAEA review of the 1968 book: The constructive uses of nuclear explosions by Edward Teller.
 “The Containment of Underground Nuclear Explosions”, Project Director Gregory E van der Vink, U.S. Congress, Office of Technology Assessment, OTA-ISC-414, (Oct 1989).

External links

 
 .
 .
 .
 .
 .
 .
 
 .
 .
 .
 .
 .
  milestones, including proposed tests and projects conducted.
 
 
 
 
 

Plowshare
Peaceful nuclear explosions